The Abbott AxSYM is an immunochemical automated analyzer made by Abbott Laboratories. It is used for serology tests and therapeutic drug monitoring, and uses antibodies to alter the deflection of polarized light. It can also be used to monitor hormone level and some cardiac markers such as troponin.


Appearance and use
Blood samples and reagents are placed in separate carousels on the right of the machine.  This instrument is used in medical laboratories by trained medical personnel. It can process about 100 samples an hour.

References

Further reading
 Evaluation of the Abbott AxSYM Immunoassay Analyser - Agnes D'Souza, M. J. Wheeler, Great Britain. Medical Devices Agency
 (6S)-5-methyltetrahydrofolate Compared to Folic Acid Supplementation: Effect ... - Yvonne Lamers 
 Natriuretic Peptides: The Hormones of the Heart
 Current Research in Head and Neck Cancer: Molecular Pathways, Novel ... 

Serology
Medical testing equipment